The 1505 Lo Mustang earthquake occurred on 6 June 1505 and had an estimated magnitude between 8.2 and 8.8 making it one of the largest earthquakes in Nepalese history. The earthquake killed an approximate 30 percent of the Nepalese population at the time. The earthquake was located in northern Nepal, affected southern China, and northern India.

See also
List of historical earthquakes
List of earthquakes in Nepal

References 

1505
Earthquakes in India
Earthquakes in Nepal
Natural disasters in Nepal
Lo Mustang
16th century in Nepal
Megathrust earthquakes in India